Mahnkopf (elevation ) is a summit in the Falken Group, a subgroup of the Karwendel range in the Austrian state of Tyrol.

Alpinism 
The Mahnkopf is the only peak in the Falken Group that can be reached as a normal alpine hike, e.g. from the hut Falkenhütte, followed by the Steinfalk (UIAA I).

Mountains of the Alps
Two-thousanders of Austria
Mountains of Tyrol (state)